The 12th Louisiana Regiment Infantry (African Descent) was a regiment in the Union Army during the American Civil War.

African Brigade
The regiment was organized between May and July 1863 and was attached to the African Brigade in the  Northeast Louisiana District until July 1863. The unit was posted at Vicksburg, Mississippi until  March 1864.

50th Regiment Infantry U.S. Colored Troops
The designation of the regiment was changed to 50th Regiment Infantry, U.S. Colored Troops on March 11, 1864.

See also
List of Louisiana Union Civil War units

References

Infantry, 012
Louisiana Infantry, 012
Military units and formations established in 1863
1863 establishments in Louisiana
Military units and formations disestablished in 1864